Chan Ming Tai (Chinese: 陳銘泰 born 30 January 1995), also known as Theophilius Chan, is an athlete from Hong Kong specialising in the long jump. He is coached by Ms Chan Wai Yin and Dr Anthony Giorgi. At the 2015 Summer Universiade he finished 4th with a jump of 7.89m (0.9). At the 2016 Asian Indoor Championships in Doha he won the bronze medal with a jump of 7.85m. At the 2017 Asian Championships in Bhubaneswar he won the silver medal with a jump of 8.03m.

His personal best in the event is 8.12m set at the Hong Kong Championships 2016. This is the current national record.

Competition record

References
3. Media extracts and Competition Profiles 2013-2016

1995 births
Living people
Hong Kong male long jumpers
Athletes (track and field) at the 2014 Asian Games
Athletes (track and field) at the 2018 Asian Games
Alumni of the University of Hong Kong
Athletes (track and field) at the 2016 Summer Olympics
Olympic athletes of Hong Kong
Asian Games competitors for Hong Kong
Competitors at the 2017 Summer Universiade
Competitors at the 2019 Summer Universiade